The 1990 Toronto Blue Jays season was the franchise's 14th season of Major League Baseball. It resulted in the Blue Jays finishing second in the American League East with a record of 86 wins and 76 losses. It was their first full season in the SkyDome, where an MLB attendance record of 3,885,284 was set that year. The Blue Jays led the division by 1½ games over the Boston Red Sox with one week left in the season. However, they then proceeded to drop six of their last eight games, losing the division title to the Red Sox by a two-game margin.

Offseason
 December 4, 1989: 1989 rule 5 draft
Sil Campusano was drafted from the Blue Jays by the Philadelphia Phillies.
Steve Wapnick was drafted from the Blue Jays by the Detroit Tigers.
 December 5, 1989: Mike Maksudian was drafted by the Blue Jays from the Miami Miracle in the 1989 minor league draft.
 December 7, 1989: José Núñez was traded by the Blue Jays to the Chicago Cubs for Paul Kilgus.
 December 17, 1989: Ernie Whitt and Kevin Batiste were traded by the Blue Jays to the Atlanta Braves for Ricky Trlicek.
 January 10, 1990: Tilson Brito was signed as an amateur free agent by the Blue Jays.
 January 29, 1990: Jim Eppard was signed as a free agent by the Blue Jays.

Regular season
The 1990 season belonged to third baseman Kelly Gruber. He had career highs in home runs and RBIs, with 31 and 118, respectively. Along with outfielder George Bell and pitcher Dave Stieb, Gruber was named an American League All-Star, stealing two bases in the All-Star Game on July 10 at Chicago's Wrigley Field. A finalist for the American League MVP Award, at season's end he was named the AL's Silver Slugger and Gold Glove Award winner at third base.

The Blue Jays were involved in two no-hitters during the 1990 season. On June 29, Dave Stewart of the Oakland Athletics no-hit them by a score of 5–0. On September 2, Jays ace Dave Stieb finally got the no-hitter that had eluded him, blanking the Cleveland Indians 3–0.

Opening Day starters
 George Bell, OF
 Junior Felix, OF
 Tony Fernández, SS
 Kelly Gruber, 3B
 Nelson Liriano, 2B
 Fred McGriff, 1B
 Greg Myers, C
 John Olerud, DH
 Dave Stieb, P
 Mookie Wilson, OF

Season standings

Record vs. opponents

Notable transactions
 May 1, 1990: Steve Wapnick was returned to the Blue Jays by the Detroit Tigers.
 May 8, 1990: Mike Flanagan was released by the Blue Jays.
 June 4, 1990: 1990 Major League Baseball draft
Steve Karsay was drafted by the Jays in the 1st round (22nd pick).
Future Heisman Trophy winner Chris Weinke was drafted by the Blue Jays. Player signed August 20, 1990.
Felipe Crespo was drafted by the Blue Jays in the 3rd round. Player signed September 22, 1990.
Howard Battle was drafted by the Blue Jays in the 4th round. Player signed June 6, 1990.
Ricardo Jordan was drafted by the Blue Jays in the 37th round.
 June 18, 1990: Kenny Williams was selected off waivers by the Blue Jays from the Detroit Tigers.
 July 27, 1990: Nelson Liriano and Pedro Muñoz were traded by the Blue Jays to the Minnesota Twins for John Candelaria.
 September 16, 1990: Mauro Gozzo and players to be named later were traded by the Blue Jays to the Cleveland Indians for Bud Black. The Blue Jays completed the trade by sending Steve Cummings to the Indians on September 21 and Alex Sanchez to the Indians on September 24.
 September 24, 1990: Rich Butler was signed as an amateur free agent by the Blue Jays.
 September 24, 1990: Rob Butler was signed as an amateur free agent by the Blue Jays.

Eric Lindros
The hype around Eric Lindros during his early career led to an exclusive deal with sports card manufacturer SCORE. Attempting to leverage this arrangement as much as possible, he was even featured on a baseball card showing him as a third baseman for the Toronto Blue Jays, although he never actually played baseball. He was only there taking batting practice one day.

Roster

Game log

|- align="center" bgcolor="ffbbbb"
| 1 || April 9 || @ Rangers || 4 – 2 || Ryan (1-0) || Stottlemyre (0-1) || Russell (1) || 40,907 || 0-1
|- align="center" bgcolor="bbffbb"
| 2 || April 10 || Rangers || 2 – 1 || Stieb (1-0) || Hough (0-1) || Wells (1) || 49,673 || 1-1
|- align="center" bgcolor="ffbbbb"
| 3 || April 11 || Rangers || 11 – 5 || Brown (1-0) || Cerutti (0-1) || Jeffcoat (1) || 35,301 || 1-2
|- align="center" bgcolor="bbffbb"
| 4 || April 12 || Rangers || 7 – 1 || Flanagan (1-0) || Moyer (0-1) || || 35,354 || 2-2
|- align="center" bgcolor="bbffbb"
| 5 || April 13 || @ Royals || 3 – 1 || Key (1-0) || Davis (0-1) || Ward (1) || 20,522 || 3-2
|- align="center" bgcolor="ffbbbb"
| 6 || April 14 || @ Royals || 3 – 1 || Saberhagen (1-0) || Stottlemyre (0-2) || Davis (2) || 25,930 || 3-3
|- align="center" bgcolor="bbffbb"
| 7 || April 15 || @ Royals || 5 – 4 || Stieb (2-0) || Crawford (0-1) || Wells (2) || 21,925 || 4-3
|- align="center" bgcolor="bbffbb"
| 8 || April 16 || Orioles || 4 – 2 || Cerutti (1-1) || Tibbs (0-1) || Henke (1) || 40,301 || 5-3
|- align="center" bgcolor="bbffbb"
| 9 || April 17 || Orioles || 8 – 2 || Flanagan (2-0) || Ballard (0-2) || || 38,212 || 6-3
|- align="center" bgcolor="ffbbbb"
| 10 || April 18 || Orioles || 8 – 5 || Harnisch (1-0) || Wills (0-1) || Olson (3) || 41,181 || 6-4
|- align="center" bgcolor="bbffbb"
| 11 || April 20 || Royals || 17 – 6 || Stottlemyre (1-2) || Saberhagen (1-1) || || 49,151 || 7-4
|- align="center" bgcolor="bbffbb"
| 12 || April 21 || Royals || 5 – 1 || Stieb (3-0) || Gubicza (1-2) || || 49,121 || 8-4
|- align="center" bgcolor="ffbbbb"
| 13 || April 22 || Royals || 7 – 1 || Gordon (1-0) || Cerutti (1-2) || || 49,056 || 8-5
|- align="center" bgcolor="bbffbb"
| 14 || April 23 || Indians || 12 – 9 || Wills (1-1) || Wickander (0-1) || Ward (2) || 34,139 || 9-5
|- align="center" bgcolor="bbffbb"
| 15 || April 24 || Indians || 4 – 3 || Key (2-0) || Swindell (1-2) || Wells (3) || 35,203 || 10-5
|- align="center" bgcolor="bbffbb"
| 16 || April 25 || Indians || 5 – 3 || Stottlemyre (2-2) || Nichols (0-1) || Ward (3) || 38,168 || 11-5
|- align="center" bgcolor="ffbbbb"
| 17 || April 26 || Indians || 4 – 3 || Candiotti (3-0) || Stieb (3-1) || Jones (5) || 44,174 || 11-6
|- align="center" bgcolor="ffbbbb"
| 18 || April 27 || @ White Sox || 6 – 1 || Hibbard (2-1) || Cerutti (1-3) || || 10,965 || 11-7
|- align="center" bgcolor="ffbbbb"
| 19 || April 28 || @ White Sox || 5 – 4 || Kutzler (1-0) || Flanagan (2-1) || Thigpen (5) || 15,395 || 11-8
|- align="center" bgcolor="ffbbbb"
| 20 || April 29 || @ White Sox || 10 – 3 || King (1-0) || Key (2-1) || Edwards (1) || 12,936 || 11-9
|- align="center" bgcolor="bbffbb"
| 21 || April 30 || @ Indians || 10 – 4 || Stottlemyre (3-2) || Bearse (0-2) || || 6,254 || 12-9
|-

|- align="center" bgcolor="bbffbb"
| 22 || May 1 || @ Indians || 4 – 3 || Stieb (4-1) || Candiotti (3-1) || Henke (2) || 5,111 || 13-9
|- align="center" bgcolor="ffbbbb"
| 23 || May 2 || @ Indians || 3 – 0 || Black (3-0) || Cerutti (1-4) || Jones (7) || 8,801 || 13-10
|- align="center" bgcolor="ffbbbb"
| 24 || May 4 || Tigers || 3 – 1 || Petry (2-1) || Flanagan (2-2) || Henneman (6) || 49,146 || 13-11
|- align="center" bgcolor="bbffbb"
| 25 || May 5 || Tigers || 5 – 1 || Stottlemyre (4-2) || Robinson (1-3) || || 49,219 || 14-11
|- align="center" bgcolor="bbffbb"
| 26 || May 6 || Tigers || 11 – 7 || Key (3-1) || Dubois (0-1) || || 49,206 || 15-11
|- align="center" bgcolor="bbffbb"
| 27 || May 7 || White Sox || 6 – 1 || Stieb (5-1) || McDowell (1-2) || || 41,384 || 16-11
|- align="center" bgcolor="ffbbbb"
| 28 || May 8 || White Sox || 4 – 1 || Hibbard (3-2) || Cerutti (1-5) || Thigpen (7) || 41,101 || 16-12
|- align="center" bgcolor="bbffbb"
| 29 || May 9 || White Sox || 4 – 3 || Wills (2-1) || Edwards (0-1) || Ward (4) || 43,128 || 17-12
|- align="center" bgcolor="ffbbbb"
| 30 || May 10 || @ Tigers || 10 – 5 || Robinson (2-3) || Stottlemyre (4-3) || || 11,296 || 17-13
|- align="center" bgcolor="bbffbb"
| 31 || May 11 || @ Tigers || 4 – 2 || Key (4-1) || Dubois (0-2) || Henke (3) || 17,376 || 18-13
|- align="center" bgcolor="bbbbbb"
| -- || May 12 || @ Tigers || colspan=6|Postponed (rain) Rescheduled for May 14
|- align="center" bgcolor="bbffbb"
| 32 || May 13 || @ Tigers || 6 – 3 || Wells (1-0) || Morris (2-5) || || 17,068 || 19-13
|- align="center" bgcolor="bbffbb"
| 33 || May 14 || @ Tigers || 8 – 3 (10) || Ward (1-0) || Henneman (0-3) || || 10,833 || 20-13
|- align="center" bgcolor="ffbbbb"
| 34 || May 15 || Mariners || 4 – 3 (10) || Comstock (1-1) || Acker (0-1) || Schooler (10) || 41,108 || 20-14
|- align="center" bgcolor="ffbbbb"
| 35 || May 16 || Mariners || 4 – 2 || Holman (6-2) || Stottlemyre (4-4) || Schooler (11) || 45,640 || 20-15
|- align="center" bgcolor="ffbbbb"
| 36 || May 17 || Mariners || 14 – 6 || Johnson (3-2) || Key (4-2) || || 47,283 || 20-16
|- align="center" bgcolor="ffbbbb"
| 37 || May 18 || Angels || 4 – 2 || Abbott (2-3) || Stieb (5-2) || Eichhorn (6) || 49,339 || 20-17
|- align="center" bgcolor="ffbbbb"
| 38 || May 19 || Angels || 11 – 9 || Fraser (1-2) || Ward (1-1) || Eichhorn (7) || 49,335 || 20-18
|- align="center" bgcolor="bbffbb"
| 39 || May 20 || Angels || 5 – 1 || Wills (3-1) || Langston (3-4) || Henke (4) || 49,421 || 21-18
|- align="center" bgcolor="ffbbbb"
| 40 || May 21 || Athletics || 4 – 1 || Welch (5-2) || Stottlemyre (4-5) || Eckersley (10) || 49,471 || 21-19
|- align="center" bgcolor="ffbbbb"
| 41 || May 22 || Athletics || 5 – 4 || Young (2-1) || Wills (3-2) || Eckersley (11) || 49,559 || 21-20
|- align="center" bgcolor="ffbbbb"
| 42 || May 23 || @ Angels || 5 – 4 || Bailes (1-0) || Ward (1-2) || || 25,179 || 21-21
|- align="center" bgcolor="ffbbbb"
| 43 || May 24 || @ Angels || 4 – 3 (11) || Harvey (2-1) || Henke (0-1) || || 24,460 || 21-22
|- align="center" bgcolor="bbffbb"
| 44 || May 25 || @ Mariners || 3 – 1 (11) || Acker (1-1) || Swift (2-2) || Henke (5) || 15,334 || 22-22
|- align="center" bgcolor="bbffbb"
| 45 || May 26 || @ Mariners || 11 – 4 || Wills (4-2) || Holman (6-3) || || 25,004 || 23-22
|- align="center" bgcolor="bbffbb"
| 46 || May 27 || @ Mariners || 5 – 1 || Cerutti (2-5) || Johnson (3-3) || || 25,858 || 24-22
|- align="center" bgcolor="bbffbb"
| 47 || May 28 || @ Athletics || 1 – 0 || Stieb (6-2) || Moore (4-4) || || 45,005 || 25-22
|- align="center" bgcolor="bbffbb"
| 48 || May 29 || @ Athletics || 2 – 1 || Wells (2-0) || Stewart (8-2) || Henke (6) || 25,255 || 26-22
|- align="center" bgcolor="ffbbbb"
| 49 || May 30 || @ Athletics || 8 – 5 || Burns (1-0) || Blair (0-1) || Eckersley (14) || 24,257 || 26-23
|-

|- align="center" bgcolor="ffbbbb"
| 50 || June 1 || Brewers || 7 – 1 || Higuera (5-1) || Stottlemyre (4-6) || Crim (3) || 49,698 || 26-24
|- align="center" bgcolor="ffbbbb"
| 51 || June 2 || Brewers || 7 – 6 || Fossas (2-3) || Wells (2-1) || Plesac (10) || 49,553 || 26-25
|- align="center" bgcolor="bbffbb"
| 52 || June 3 || Brewers || 7 – 4 || Stieb (7-2) || Knudson (3-3) || Henke (7) || 49,702 || 27-25
|- align="center" bgcolor="bbffbb"
| 53 || June 5 || Twins || 7 – 3 || Wells (3-1) || Smith (4-5) || || 49,741 || 28-25
|- align="center" bgcolor="ffbbbb"
| 54 || June 6 || Twins || 12 – 5 || Candelaria (7-1) || Blair (0-2) || || 49,652 || 28-26
|- align="center" bgcolor="bbffbb"
| 55 || June 7 || Twins || 10 – 3 || Stottlemyre (5-6) || Tapani (6-4) || || 49,845 || 29-26
|- align="center" bgcolor="bbffbb"
| 56 || June 8 || @ Brewers || 11 – 5 || Gilles (1-0) || Crim (2-2) || Henke (8) || 27,021 || 30-26
|- align="center" bgcolor="bbffbb"
| 57 || June 9 || @ Brewers || 7 – 3 || Stieb (8-2) || Bosio (4-4) || || 46,612 || 31-26
|- align="center" bgcolor="bbffbb"
| 58 || June 10 || @ Brewers || 13 – 5 || Wells (4-1) || Navarro (2-2) || || 18,091 || 32-26
|- align="center" bgcolor="ffbbbb"
| 59 || June 11 || @ Brewers || 4 – 1 || Krueger (3-3) || Blair (0-3) || Plesac (11) || 17,701 || 32-27
|- align="center" bgcolor="bbffbb"
| 60 || June 12 || @ Twins || 5 – 4 || Stottlemyre (6-6) || Candelaria (7-2) || Ward (5) || 18,298 || 33-27
|- align="center" bgcolor="bbffbb"
| 61 || June 13 || @ Twins || 10 – 1 || Cerutti (3-5) || West (2-4) || Henke (9) || 17,086 || 34-27
|- align="center" bgcolor="bbffbb"
| 62 || June 14 || @ Twins || 7 – 1 || Stieb (9-2) || Anderson (2-9) || || 18,679 || 35-27
|- align="center" bgcolor="bbffbb"
| 63 || June 15 || @ Yankees || 5 – 4 || Wells (5-1) || Robinson (0-5) || Henke (10) || 31,827 || 36-27
|- align="center" bgcolor="bbffbb"
| 64 || June 16 || @ Yankees || 2 – 1 (11) || Wills (5-2) || Mills (0-2) || Ward (6) || 26,061 || 37-27
|- align="center" bgcolor="bbffbb"
| 65 || June 17 || @ Yankees || 8 – 1 || Stottlemyre (7-6) || LaPoint (4-6) || || 38,173 || 38-27
|- align="center" bgcolor="ffbbbb"
| 66 || June 19 || Red Sox || 4 – 2 || Kiecker (2-3) || Ward (1-3) || Murphy (3) || 49,907 || 38-28
|- align="center" bgcolor="bbffbb"
| 67 || June 20 || Red Sox || 11 – 0 || Stieb (10-2) || Gardner (1-4) || Henke (11) || 49,857 || 39-28
|- align="center" bgcolor="ffbbbb"
| 68 || June 21 || Yankees || 7 – 6 || Mills (1-2) || Acker (1-2) || Righetti (14) || 49,883 || 39-29
|- align="center" bgcolor="ffbbbb"
| 69 || June 22 || Yankees || 8 – 7 (15) || Cadaret (2-4) || Blair (0-4) || Righetti (15) || 49,908 || 39-30
|- align="center" bgcolor="bbffbb"
| 70 || June 23 || Yankees || 8 – 4 || Stottlemyre (8-6) || Leary (3-10) || Henke (12) || 49,858 || 40-30
|- align="center" bgcolor="bbffbb"
| 71 || June 24 || Yankees || 8 – 3 || Cerutti (4-5) || Cary (4-3) || Acker (1) || 49,806 || 41-30
|- align="center" bgcolor="ffbbbb"
| 72 || June 25 || @ Red Sox || 10 – 8 || Lamp (1-2) || Blair (0-5) || Reardon (11) || 32,591 || 41-31
|- align="center" bgcolor="ffbbbb"
| 73 || June 26 || @ Red Sox || 3 – 0 || Gardner (2-4) || Wells (5-2) || Reardon (12) || 23,244 || 41-32
|- align="center" bgcolor="ffbbbb"
| 74 || June 27 || @ Red Sox || 9 – 5 || Boddicker (10-3) || Key (4-3) || Gray (2) || 32,961 || 41-33
|- align="center" bgcolor="ffbbbb"
| 75 || June 28 || @ Red Sox || 4 – 3 || Clemens (12-3) || Stottlemyre (8-7) || Reardon (13) || 34,547 || 41-34
|- align="center" bgcolor="ffbbbb"
| 76 || June 29 || Athletics || 5 – 0 || Stewart (10-6) || Cerutti (4-6) || || 49,817 || 41-35
|- align="center" bgcolor="ffbbbb"
| 77 || June 30 || Athletics || 9 – 4 || Welch (13-2) || Stieb (10-3) || || 49,865 || 41-36
|-

|- align="center" bgcolor="bbffbb"
| 78 || July 1 || Athletics || 4 – 3 || Blair (1-5) || Burns (2-2) || Henke (13) || 49,857 || 42-36
|- align="center" bgcolor="ffbbbb"
| 79 || July 2 || Athletics || 3 – 2 || Moore (6-7) || Key (4-4) || Eckersley (25) || 49,855 || 42-37
|- align="center" bgcolor="bbffbb"
| 80 || July 3 || Angels || 5 – 2 || Stottlemyre (9-7) || Blyleven (7-5) || Henke (14) || 49,836 || 43-37
|- align="center" bgcolor="bbffbb"
| 81 || July 4 || Angels || 4 – 2 || Cerutti (5-6) || Abbott (5-7) || Henke (15) || 49,831 || 44-37
|- align="center" bgcolor="bbffbb"
| 82 || July 5 || Angels || 9 – 2 || Stieb (11-3) || McCaskill (6-5) || || 49,838 || 45-37
|- align="center" bgcolor="bbffbb"
| 83 || July 6 || Mariners || 1 – 0 || Wells (6-2) || Holman (8-7) || Henke (16) || 49,872 || 46-37
|- align="center" bgcolor="bbffbb"
| 84 || July 7 || Mariners || 4 – 2 || Key (5-4) || Swan (1-2) || Ward (7) || 48,899 || 47-37
|- align="center" bgcolor="ffbbbb"
| 85 || July 8 || Mariners || 6 – 3 || Young (3-9) || Stottlemyre (9-8) || || 49,816 || 47-38
|- align="center" bgcolor="bbffbb"
| 86 || July 12 || @ Angels || 5 – 0 || Wells (7-2) || McCaskill (6-6) || || 27,365 || 48-38
|- align="center" bgcolor="ffbbbb"
| 87 || July 13 || @ Angels || 2 – 0 || Abbott (6-7) || Stottlemyre (9-9) || || 35,001 || 48-39
|- align="center" bgcolor="ffbbbb"
| 88 || July 14 || @ Angels || 8 – 7 || Eichhorn (1-4) || Ward (1-4) || || 34,446 || 48-40
|- align="center" bgcolor="ffbbbb"
| 89 || July 15 || @ Angels || 3 – 2 || Finley (12-4) || Henke (0-2) || || 31,609 || 48-41
|- align="center" bgcolor="bbffbb"
| 90 || July 16 || @ Mariners || 4 – 3 || Key (6-4) || Hanson (10-7) || Henke (17) || 24,833 || 49-41
|- align="center" bgcolor="ffbbbb"
| 91 || July 17 || @ Mariners || 7 – 5 || Jackson (4-3) || Ward (1-5) || Schooler (24) || 14,259 || 49-42
|- align="center" bgcolor="ffbbbb"
| 92 || July 18 || @ Mariners || 5 – 2 || Young (4-10) || Stottlemyre (9-10) || || 15,868 || 49-43
|- align="center" bgcolor="bbffbb"
| 93 || July 20 || @ Athletics || 8 – 6 || Cerutti (6-6) || Young (5-4) || Henke (18) || 40,171 || 50-43
|- align="center" bgcolor="bbffbb"
| 94 || July 21 || @ Athletics || 2 – 1 || Stieb (12-3) || Sanderson (11-6) || Henke (19) || 43,097 || 51-43
|- align="center" bgcolor="ffbbbb"
| 95 || July 22 || @ Athletics || 3 – 0 || Moore (9-8) || Key (6-5) || Honeycutt (4) || 43,821 || 51-44
|- align="center" bgcolor="ffbbbb"
| 96 || July 24 || Royals || 5 – 3 (13) || Farr (8-4) || Ward (1-6) || || 49,884 || 51-45
|- align="center" bgcolor="ffbbbb"
| 97 || July 25 || Royals || 6 – 1 || McGaffigan (1-0) || Stottlemyre (9-11) || || 49,855 || 51-46
|- align="center" bgcolor="bbffbb"
| 98 || July 26 || Royals || 7 – 5 || Cerutti (7-6) || Appier (5-4) || Henke (20) || 49,862 || 52-46
|- align="center" bgcolor="bbffbb"
| 99 || July 27 || Rangers || 1 – 0 || Stieb (13-3) || Hough (7-7) || Henke (21) || 49,882 || 53-46
|- align="center" bgcolor="ffbbbb"
| 100 || July 28 || Rangers || 3 – 2 (13) || Arnsberg (4-1) || Wills (5-3) || Barfield (1) || 49,850 || 53-47
|- align="center" bgcolor="bbffbb"
| 101 || July 29 || Rangers || 10 – 8 || Acker (2-2) || McMurtry (0-1) || Candelaria (5) || 49,853 || 54-47
|- align="center" bgcolor="bbffbb"
| 102 || July 30 || @ Orioles || 9 – 2 || Stottlemyre (10-11) || Milacki (4-8) || Ward (8) || 43,638 || 55-47
|- align="center" bgcolor="ffbbbb"
| 103 || July 31 || @ Orioles || 6 – 4 || McDonald (3-0) || Cerutti (7-7) || Olson (24) || 37,771 || 55-48
|-

|- align="center" bgcolor="bbffbb"
| 104 || August 1 || @ Orioles || 7 – 4 || Stieb (14-3) || Ballard (1-10) || Henke (22) || 40,625 || 56-48
|- align="center" bgcolor="ffbbbb"
| 105 || August 2 || @ Rangers || 5 – 4 (11) || Arnsberg (5-1) || Candelaria (7-4) || || 30,814 || 56-49
|- align="center" bgcolor="ffbbbb"
| 106 || August 3 || @ Rangers || 9 – 1 || Moyer (1-3) || Wells (7-3) || || 23,728 || 56-50
|- align="center" bgcolor="ffbbbb"
| 107 || August 4 || @ Rangers || 3 – 2 || Witt (10-8) || Stottlemyre (10-12) || || 35,211 || 56-51
|- align="center" bgcolor="bbffbb"
| 108 || August 5 || @ Rangers || 6 – 4 || Cerutti (8-7) || Ryan (11-5) || Henke (23) || 41,635 || 57-51
|- align="center" bgcolor="ffbbbb"
| 109 || August 6 || @ Rangers || 4 – 3 || Hough (9-7) || Stieb (14-4) || Rogers (11) || 28,638 || 57-52
|- align="center" bgcolor="bbffbb"
| 110 || August 7 || Tigers || 11 – 7 || Key (7-5) || Morris (9-14) || || 49,894 || 58-52
|- align="center" bgcolor="bbffbb"
| 111 || August 8 || Tigers || 8 – 3 || Wells (8-3) || Terrell (0-1) || || 49,897 || 59-52
|- align="center" bgcolor="ffbbbb"
| 112 || August 9 || Tigers || 5 – 4 || Robinson (9-9) || Stottlemyre (10-13) || Gleaton (6) || 49,911 || 59-53
|- align="center" bgcolor="ffbbbb"
| 113 || August 10 || Twins || 7 – 3 || West (6-7) || Cerutti (8-8) || || 49,888 || 59-54
|- align="center" bgcolor="bbffbb"
| 114 || August 11 || Twins || 7 – 4 || Stieb (15-4) || Leach (2-4) || Henke (24) || 49,873 || 60-54
|- align="center" bgcolor="ffbbbb"
| 115 || August 12 || Twins || 5 – 4 || Anderson (5-15) || Key (7-6) || || 49,892 || 60-55
|- align="center" bgcolor="bbffbb"
| 116 || August 13 || @ White Sox || 4 – 3 || Ward (2-6) || Thigpen (4-5) || Henke (25) || 28,961 || 61-55
|- align="center" bgcolor="bbffbb"
| 117 || August 14 || @ White Sox || 12 – 4 || Stottlemyre (11-13) || Hibbard (9-7) || || 24,314 || 62-55
|- align="center" bgcolor="ffbbbb"
| 118 || August 15 || @ White Sox || 4 – 3 || McDowell (9-6) || Candelaria (7-5) || Thigpen (38) || 27,947 || 62-56
|- align="center" bgcolor="bbffbb"
| 119 || August 17 || @ Twins || 5 – 1 || Stieb (16-4) || Erickson (3-3) || Ward (9) || 28,173 || 63-56
|- align="center" bgcolor="bbffbb"
| 120 || August 18 || @ Twins || 3 – 0 || Key (8-6) || Anderson (5-16) || Henke (26) || 32,605 || 64-56
|- align="center" bgcolor="bbffbb"
| 121 || August 19 || @ Twins || 9 – 1 || Wells (9-3) || Guthrie (4-6) || || 29,004 || 65-56
|- align="center" bgcolor="ffbbbb"
| 122 || August 20 || @ Yankees || 6 – 5 (11) || Cadaret (5-4) || Acker (2-3) || || 21,661 || 65-57
|- align="center" bgcolor="ffbbbb"
| 123 || August 21 || @ Yankees || 3 – 2 || Cary (5-8) || Candelaria (7-6) || Guetterman (2) || 22,315 || 65-58
|- align="center" bgcolor="ffbbbb"
| 124 || August 22 || @ Yankees || 4 – 2 || Hawkins (4-10) || Cerutti (8-9) || Righetti (27) || 25,088 || 65-59
|- align="center" bgcolor="bbffbb"
| 125 || August 23 || Red Sox || 4 – 3 || Henke (1-2) || Hesketh (0-1) || || 49,918 || 66-59
|- align="center" bgcolor="ffbbbb"
| 126 || August 24 || Red Sox || 2 – 0 || Kiecker (5-6) || Ward (2-7) || Gray (5) || 49,914 || 66-60
|- align="center" bgcolor="ffbbbb"
| 127 || August 25 || Red Sox || 1 – 0 || Clemens (19-5) || Wells (9-4) || || 49,890 || 66-61
|- align="center" bgcolor="ffbbbb"
| 128 || August 26 || Red Sox || 1 – 0 || Harris (11-5) || Stottlemyre (11-14) || Gray (6) || 49,897 || 66-62
|- align="center" bgcolor="ffbbbb"
| 129 || August 27 || Brewers || 4 – 2 || Higuera (8-6) || Acker (2-4) || || 49,892 || 66-63
|- align="center" bgcolor="ffbbbb"
| 130 || August 28 || Brewers || 6 – 2 || Navarro (5-5) || Stieb (16-5) || || 49,871 || 66-64
|- align="center" bgcolor="bbffbb"
| 131 || August 29 || Brewers || 7 – 3 || Key (9-6) || Knudson (10-7) || Ward (10) || 49,909 || 67-64
|- align="center" bgcolor="bbffbb"
| 132 || August 31 || @ Indians || 12 – 8 || Acker (3-4) || Swindell (10-8) || || 12,508 || 68-64
|-

|- align="center" bgcolor="bbffbb"
| 133 || September 1 || @ Indians || 8 – 0 || Stottlemyre (12-14) || Candiotti (13-10) || || 16,547 || 69-64
|- align="center" bgcolor="bbffbb"
| 134 || September 2 || @ Indians || 3 – 0 || Stieb (17-5) || Black (10-9) || || 23,640 || 70-64
|- align="center" bgcolor="ffbbbb"
| 135 || September 3 || @ Tigers || 5 – 0 || Terrell (4-2) || Key (9-7) || || 33,658 || 70-65
|- align="center" bgcolor="ffbbbb"
| 136 || September 4 || @ Tigers || 3 – 1 || Gibson (4-4) || Ward (2-8) || Henneman (20) || 14,760 || 70-66
|- align="center" bgcolor="bbffbb"
| 137 || September 5 || @ Tigers || 7 – 3 || Wells (10-4) || Parker (3-2) || || 16,677 || 71-66
|- align="center" bgcolor="bbffbb"
| 138 || September 7 || White Sox || 3 – 1 || Stottlemyre (13-14) || Pérez (12-13) || Henke (27) || 49,885 || 72-66
|- align="center" bgcolor="bbffbb"
| 139 || September 8 || White Sox || 3 – 0 || Stieb (18-5) || Fernandez (2-3) || Henke (28) || 49,898 || 73-66
|- align="center" bgcolor="bbffbb"
| 140 || September 9 || White Sox || 6 – 1 || Key (10-7) || McDowell (12-7) || || 49,870 || 74-66
|- align="center" bgcolor="bbffbb"
| 141 || September 10 || @ Royals || 6 – 1 || Wells (11-4) || Wagner (0-1) || || 22,158 || 75-66
|- align="center" bgcolor="bbffbb"
| 142 || September 11 || @ Royals || 8 – 4 || Wills (6-3) || Stottlemyre (0-1) || Ward (11) || 18,493 || 76-66
|- align="center" bgcolor="ffbbbb"
| 143 || September 12 || @ Royals || 7 – 5 || Gordon (11-10) || Stottlemyre (13-15) || Davis (6) || 20,135 || 76-67
|- align="center" bgcolor="ffbbbb"
| 144 || September 13 || Orioles || 5 – 3 || Mesa (1-2) || Stieb (18-6) || Olson (31) || 49,875 || 76-68
|- align="center" bgcolor="bbffbb"
| 145 || September 14 || Orioles || 8 – 7 || Blair (2-5) || Olson (5-5) || || 49,893 || 77-68
|- align="center" bgcolor="bbffbb"
| 146 || September 15 || Orioles || 4 – 3 || Blair (3-5) || Schilling (1-2) || || 49,888 || 78-68
|- align="center" bgcolor="bbffbb"
| 147 || September 16 || Orioles || 6 – 5 || Henke (2-2) || Price (3-4) || || 49,886 || 79-68
|- align="center" bgcolor="bbffbb"
| 148 || September 17 || Yankees || 6 – 4 || Cerutti (9-9) || Plunk (5-3) || Henke (29) || 49,902 || 80-68
|- align="center" bgcolor="bbffbb"
| 149 || September 18 || Yankees || 3 – 2 || Black (12-10) || Guetterman (10-7) || || 49,887 || 81-68
|- align="center" bgcolor="bbffbb"
| 150 || September 19 || Yankees || 7 – 6 || Key (11-7) || Leary (9-19) || Henke (30) || 49,890 || 82-68
|- align="center" bgcolor="ffbbbb"
| 151 || September 21 || Indians || 2 – 1 (13) || Valdez (1-1) || Wills (6-4) || Jones (39) || 49,894 || 82-69
|- align="center" bgcolor="ffbbbb"
| 152 || September 22 || Indians || 5 – 2 || Shaw (3-4) || Stottlemyre (13-16) || Jones (40) || 49,883 || 82-70
|- align="center" bgcolor="bbffbb"
| 153 || September 23 || Indians || 5 – 4 (10) || Acker (4-4) || Ward (1-3) || || 49,901 || 83-70
|- align="center" bgcolor="bbffbb"
| 154 || September 24 || @ Brewers || 9 – 5 || Key (12-7) || Navarro (7-7) || Henke (31) || 8,769 || 84-70
|- align="center" bgcolor="ffbbbb"
| 155 || September 25 || @ Brewers || 8 – 4 || Krueger (6-8) || Black (12-11) || || 8,576 || 84-71
|- align="center" bgcolor="ffbbbb"
| 156 || September 26 || @ Brewers || 6 – 0 || Robinson (12-4) || Wells (11-5) || || 8,804 || 84-72
|- align="center" bgcolor="ffbbbb"
| 157 || September 28 || @ Red Sox || 7 – 6 || Reardon (4-3) || Henke (2-3) || || 35,735 || 84-73
|- align="center" bgcolor="ffbbbb"
| 158 || September 29 || @ Red Sox || 7 – 5 || Clemens (21-6) || Stottlemyre (13-17) || Reardon (20) || 35,444 || 84-74
|- align="center" bgcolor="bbffbb"
| 159 || September 30 || @ Red Sox || 10 – 5 || Key (13-7) || Hesketh (0-4) || || 34,400 || 85-74
|-

|- align="center" bgcolor="ffbbbb"
| 160 || October 1 || @ Orioles || 6 – 3 || Mesa (3-2) || Wells (11-6) || Olson (37) || 24,442 || 85-75
|- align="center" bgcolor="bbffbb"
| 161 || October 2 || @ Orioles || 2 – 1 || Black (13-11) || Johnson (13-9) || Henke (32) || 19,789 || 86-75
|- align="center" bgcolor="ffbbbb"
| 162 || October 3 || @ Orioles || 3 – 2 || Olson (6-5) || Henke (2-4) || || 26,913 || 86-76
|-

Player stats

Batting

Starters by position
Note: Pos = Position; G = Games played; AB = At bats; H = Hits; Avg. = Batting average; HR = Home runs; RBI = Runs batted in

Other batters
Note: G = Games played; AB = At bats; H = Hits; Avg. = Batting average; HR = Home runs; RBI = Runs batted in

Pitching

Starting pitchers
Note: G = Games pitched; IP = Innings pitched; W = Wins; L = Losses; ERA = Earned run average; SO = Strikeouts

Other pitchers
Note: G = Games pitched; IP = Innings pitched; W = Wins; L = Losses; ERA = Earned run average; SO = Strikeouts

Relief pitchers
Note: G = Games pitched; W = Wins; L = Losses; SV = Saves; ERA = Earned run average; SO = Strikeouts

Award winners
Kelly Gruber, Player of the Month Award, September
 Kelly Gruber, Silver Slugger Award
 Kelly Gruber, Gold Glove Award

All-Star Game
 George Bell, OF
 Kelly Gruber, 3B
 Dave Stieb, P

Farm system

References

External links
1990 Toronto Blue Jays at Baseball Reference
1990 Toronto Blue Jays at Baseball Almanac

Toronto Blue Jays seasons
Toronto Blue Jays season
Toronto Blue
1990 in Toronto